Dimitri Tatanashvili (born 19 October 1983) is a Georgian football player who plays for FC Shukura Kobuleti.

International career
Tatanashvili has made one appearance for the Georgia national football team, a friendly against Azerbaijan on 12 September 2007.

References

External links
 
 
 UEFA profile

Footballers from Georgia (country)
Expatriate footballers from Georgia (country)
Living people
1983 births
Georgia (country) international footballers
FC Spartaki Tskhinvali players
FC Ameri Tbilisi players
FC Viktoria Plzeň players
SK Kladno players
FC Metalurh Zaporizhzhia players
FC Dinamo Tbilisi players
FC Metalurgi Rustavi players
FC Chikhura Sachkhere players
FC Zestafoni players
FC Dinamo Batumi players
FC Sioni Bolnisi players
FC Saburtalo Tbilisi players
FC Kakheti Telavi players
FC Shukura Kobuleti players
Association football forwards
Expatriate footballers in the Czech Republic
Expatriate footballers in Ukraine
Expatriate sportspeople from Georgia (country) in the Czech Republic
Expatriate sportspeople from Georgia (country) in Ukraine